The Right Wing of the Republic is a political party in Poland founded by former Marshal of the Sejm Marek Jurek on 20 April 2007 after he had left Law and Justice on 16 April 2007, when the Sejm failed to pass a constitutional amendment outlawing abortion. The party positions itself as a Christian conservative party with a strong focus on family rights and an anti-abortion stance.

Political program 
The program of the Right Wing of the Republic includes:
 Constitutional prohibition of abortion.
 Prohibiting prostitution and pornography.
 Public combat against cultural Marxism and gender ideology.
 Restoration of capital punishment for homicide and rape.
 Tax concessions for families and expanded pro-family policy.
 Privatization of some state-owned companies (excluding strategic energy and mining industries).
 Longer maternity leave.
 Reinforcement public health care.
 Opposition to joining euro zone.
 Reduced government spending.
 Labor law liberalization.
 Holidays on Sunday and other religious festivities.
Introduction of Demeny voting

Former Sejm members 
 Marek Jurek
 Małgorzata Bartyzel
 Marian Piłka
 Lucyna Wiśniewska
 Dariusz Kłeczek
 Artur Zawisza
 Jan Klawiter

Former Senat members 
 Adam Biela
 Mieczysław Maziarz

Former European Parliament members 
 Marek Jurek

Election results

Sejm

*Only 217 of those were actually from the party. 9 of the elected were members of Solidarity for Poland, 8 were members of Poland Together and Jan Klawiter was a member of Right Wing of the Republic. Under an agreement between the two parties he is an independent in the Sejm (not affiliated to any parliamentary faction).

See also

 Law and Justice

References

External links
Official website

2007 establishments in Poland
Catholic political parties
Conservative parties in Poland
Eurosceptic parties in Poland
National conservative parties
Far-right political parties in Poland
Political parties established in 2007
Political parties in Poland
Social conservative parties
Catholicism and far-right politics
Anti-abortion organizations
Anti-communist parties
European Christian Political Movement
Right-wing parties in Europe